Angélica Margarita Arambarri (22 April 1945, in La Plata – 11 December 2012, in La Plata) was an Argentine botanist and mycologist. She was vice dean of the Faculty of Natural Sciences and Museum of the National University of La Plata.

References 

1945 births
2012 deaths
Argentine botanists
Argentine mycologists